Victor Frankenstein is a 2015 American science fiction horror film based on contemporary adaptations of Mary Shelley's 1818 novel Frankenstein; or, The Modern Prometheus. It is directed by Paul McGuigan and written by Max Landis, and stars Daniel Radcliffe, James McAvoy, Jessica Brown Findlay, Andrew Scott, and Charles Dance. The film was released by 20th Century Fox on November 25, 2015.

Told from Igor's perspective, it shows the troubled young assistant's dark origins and his redemptive friendship with the young medical student, Victor Frankenstein. Through Igor's eyes, the audience witnesses the emergence of Frankenstein as the man from the legend we know today. Eventually, their experiments get them into trouble with the authorities, and Dr. Frankenstein and Igor become fugitives as they complete their goals to use science as a way to create life from death. The film received generally negative reviews and became a box office bomb, grossing $34.2 million against a budget of $40 million.

Plot
In  1860s London, ambitious medical student Victor Frankenstein attends a circus performance, where he helps save an injured aerialist, Lorelei, with the aid of a nameless hunchback who is enslaved by the circus' ringleader and harbors feelings for the girl. Impressed by the hunchback's vast knowledge of human anatomy, acquired from stolen books, Victor rescues him, drains the cyst on his back that causes his physical abnormality, and gives him a harness to improve his posture – he then names him "Igor Straussman" after his roommate who is not often at home. The two then become partners in Victor's ongoing experiments to resurrect life through artificial means, incurring the wrath of devoutly religious police inspector Roderick Turpin, who views their experiments as blasphemy.

When Victor shows Igor his use of electricity to animate eyes, Igor suggests he made mistakes attaching the nerves, leading Victor to ask Igor to perform the surgical parts of his experiment. Victor procures parts from dead animals and makes Igor restore the organs, which Victor secretly uses to create a monstrous chimpanzee-like creature nicknamed "Gordon".

Igor reunites with Lorelei, now masquerading as the mistress of a closeted gay baron, upsetting Victor, who views Lorelei as a distraction. Igor invites Lorelei to a demonstration of their experiment, which goes awry when Gordon escapes and wreaks havoc through the university before being killed by Victor and Igor. Lorelei is horrified by Victor's experiments and urges Igor to stop him from pursuing the matter further, but Igor is reluctant to do so upon learning that Victor is driven by the need to atone for his indirect role in the death of his older brother, Henry, for which Victor's domineering father blames Victor.

Victor is expelled from college for his unorthodox methods, but attracts the attention of his wealthy, arrogant classmate Finnegan, who wants him to create an artificial humanoid creature. Victor and Igor outline a behemoth named "Prometheus", but Igor's deepening relationship with Lorelei soon causes a rift between them.

Turpin and his men raid Victor's laboratory, hell-bent on destroying his inventions. During the raid Igor stumbles onto the corpse of the real Igor Straussman, dead from an overdose, and the source of the eyes Victor had used in his experiments.  When he attacks Victor, Turpin loses a hand and is blinded in one eye. Victor and Igor escape in a carriage sent by Finnegan and are taken to his family's estate.  Turpin is fired from Scotland Yard for having invaded Victor's home without a warrant.

Finnegan provides the scientists with the necessary funds to build Prometheus and offers them laboratory facilities at his family's estate in Scotland. Igor is suspicious of Finnegan and outraged with Victor for his treatment of the original Igor.  After a falling out, Victor departs for Scotland alone. Finnegan kidnaps and binds Igor, revealing his plans to kill Victor once Prometheus is complete and weaponize his creation. Igor is then thrown into the River Thames to drown, but manages to escape and reunites with Lorelei, who nurses him back to health.

Igor and Lorelei embark to Finnegan's estate in order to rescue Victor. Igor finds Victor on the verge of using lightning to animate Prometheus. Victor ignores Igor's pleas and activates the machine. A power surge overloads the machinery, killing Finnegan and several of his employees. During the ensuing chaos, Turpin unexpectedly arrives, blaming and threatening Victor for his creation. Prometheus suddenly awakens and steps forward. Victor is initially ecstatic that the experiment has worked, sharing a brief moment with Prometheus, thinking him to be his resurrected brother Henry. Victor quickly realizes that the experiment has failed: Prometheus has no consciousness and cannot talk. The shocked Turpin opens fire on Prometheus, who goes into a rage, killing Turpin and nearly killing Victor. Returning to his senses, Victor joins forces with Igor to kill Prometheus by stabbing its two hearts.

After regaining consciousness the next morning, Igor reunites with Lorelei, who hands him a letter written to him by Victor, in which Victor apologizes for all the suffering he caused and tells Igor that he is allowed to live his life with Lorelei. Victor informs Igor to be ready for when Victor may one day ask for his help, and recognizes that Igor was his "greatest creation". Victor retreats to the Scottish countryside in search of new discoveries.

Cast
James McAvoy as Victor Frankenstein
 Daniel Radcliffe as Igor Straussman
 Jessica Brown Findlay as Lorelei
 Andrew Scott as Inspector Roderick Turpin
 Charles Dance as Baron Frankenstein
 Freddie Fox as Finnegan
 Mark Gatiss as Dettweiler
 Callum Turner as Alistair
 Daniel Mays as Barnaby
 Spencer Wilding and Guillaume Delaunay as Frankenstein's monster aka "Prometheus"
 Bronson Webb as Rafferty
Adam Nagaitis as Winthrop (uncredited)

Production
The project was first announced by 20th Century Fox in 2011 with Max Landis set to write the script.  Paul McGuigan was announced as the director in September 2012. Daniel Radcliffe also began talks to join the film that month, and officially joined the cast as Igor in March 2013. In July 2013, James McAvoy joined the cast to play Victor Frankenstein. Jessica Brown Findlay joined the cast in September.

In October 2013, the film's release date was delayed from October 17, 2014 to January 16, 2015. In March 2014, the film was pushed back again to October 2, 2015. Filming mostly took place in the United Kingdom, with stage filming at Longcross and Twickenham Film Studios and location shooting at Chatham Historic Dockyard. Principal photography began on November 25, 2013, and ended on March 20, 2014. In June 2015, the film's release date was pushed back from 2 October 2015, to November 25, 2015, which was first assigned to The Peanuts Movie and The Martian.

Marketing

The first trailer for the film was released by 20th Century Fox on August 18, 2015.

Reception

Box office
Victor Frankenstein grossed $5.8 million in North America and $28.5 million in other territories for a total of $34.2 million, against a budget of $40 million.

In North America, Victor Frankenstein opened on Wednesday, November 25, 2015 alongside Creed and The Good Dinosaur, as well as the wide releases of Brooklyn, Spotlight and Trumbo. The film was originally projected to gross $12 million from 2,797 theaters in its first five days, including $6–8 million in its opening weekend. However, after grossing $175,000 from its Tuesday night screenings and $620,000 on its opening day, five-day projections were lowered to $3–4 million. The film ended up grossing $2.4 million in its opening weekend and $3.4 million over its first five days, breaking the record set by Won't Back Down for the lowest opening gross in over 2,500 theaters until Friend Request in 2017.

Critical response

On Rotten Tomatoes, the film has an approval rating of 27%, based on 143 reviews, with an average rating of 4.68/10. The site's consensus reads, "A re-imagining without the imagining, Victor Frankenstein plays at providing a fresh perspective on an oft-told tale, but ultimately offers little of interest that viewers haven't already seen in superior Frankenstein films." On Metacritic, the film has a score of 36 out of 100, based on 28 critics, indicating "generally unfavorable reviews". Audiences polled by CinemaScore gave the film an average grade of "C" on an A+ to F scale.

Empire rated the film 4 out of 5 stars, writing "Aiming to do for Victor Frankenstein what Guy Ritchie did for Sherlock Holmes, set in the past but with a playful, postmodern sensibility that zaps new life into Shelley’s 200 year-old Gothic masterpiece." Total Film gave the film an average 3 out of 5. "Each murky frame is bursting with grime and clutter... because everything is too busy, too loud, too determined to do what Guy Ritchie and Mark Gatiss have done for Sherlock Holmes. The result is far from monstrous but it's hardly divine, either."

In response to the low score on Rotten Tomatoes, writer Max Landis wrote that the site "breaks down entire reviews into just the word 'yes' or 'no', making criticism binary in a destructive arbitrary way".

See also
 List of films featuring Frankenstein's monster

References

External links

 
 
 
 
 

2015 films
2010s English-language films
2010s monster movies
2015 horror films
2010s science fiction films
2010s science fiction horror films
20th Century Fox films
American science fiction horror films
American body horror films
Davis Entertainment films
Frankenstein films
Gothic horror films
Films about reincarnation
Films directed by Paul McGuigan
Films produced by John Davis
Films set in the 19th century
Films set in London
Films set in the Victorian era
Films shot in England
Films with screenplays by Max Landis
Films scored by Craig Armstrong (composer)
Films shot in Greater Manchester
2010s American films